"Mr. Raffles (Man, It Was Mean)" is a song by the British rock band Steve Harley & Cockney Rebel, which was released in 1975 as the second and final single from their third studio album The Best Years of Our Lives. The song was written by Harley, and produced by Harley and Alan Parsons. "Mr. Raffles (Man, It Was Mean)" reached number 13 in the UK Singles Chart.

Background
"Mr. Raffles (Man, It Was Mean)" was released as the follow-up single to "Make Me Smile (Come Up and See Me)" which reached number one in the UK in February 1975. After The Best Years of Our Lives had reached the UK top 5 in March, "Mr. Raffles" was released in May. It reached number 13 in the UK Singles Chart and remained in the top 50 for six weeks.

The song's titular character refers to the author E. W. Hornung's fictional thief A. J. Raffles. Speaking to Mojo in 2010, Harley said about the song,

Release
"Mr. Raffles (Man, It Was Mean)" was released by EMI Records on 7-inch vinyl in the UK, Belgium, Finland, Germany, the Netherlands, Australia, New Zealand and Japan. It was released in Yugoslavia by Jugoton. For its release as a single, "Mr. Raffles" was edited down by a minute and a half to make a three-minute version. This single version remained exclusive to the single until it was included as a bonus track on the 2014 'Definitive Edition' of The Best Years of Our Lives.

The B-side is a live version of "Sebastian", originally recorded by Cockney Rebel for their 1973 debut album The Human Menagerie. Produced by Harley and Parsons, it was recorded at the Hammersmith Odeon, London, on 14 April 1975. In addition to the five main members of Cockney Rebel, the recording also features drummer Stuart Elliott's younger brother Lyndsey Elliott on additional percussion and guitarist Snowy White, who joined the band on The Best Years of Our Lives tour as rhythm guitarist.

Promotion
The band performed the song on the UK music show Top of the Pops, which was broadcast on 5 June 1975. Although the audio from the performance survives, the footage was later wiped by the BBC and is presumed lost.

The song has been performed live by Harley and the band on many occasions, and various live versions have been recorded for official releases. In April 1975, the song was included as part of the band's set at the Hammersmith Odeon. The concert was filmed and released as a film titled Between the Lines. A 1989 performance of the song during the band's concert at Brighton was included on the VHS release The Come Back, All is Forgiven Tour: Live. Another version appears on the 1995 album Live at the BBC, which Harley recorded during a session for Nicky Campbell in 1992.

Critical reception
On its release as a single, Sue Byrom of Record Mirror wrote, "If there's one thing the new Harley & Cockney Rebel doesn't seem to be on first hearing, it's commercial. Changes of rhythm, taped cheers, little touch of palm-tree music here and there... commercial? But then you listen again, and again, and yup, somehow it looks like Stevie's going to do it again!" Colin Irwin of Melody Maker described the song as "curiously tuneless affair", but with "enough wayward charm to take it in[to] the chart". He noted the "off-beat continental feel", the "underlying Caribbean flavour that breaks out towards the end" and Harley's "usual exaggeratedly pained" vocal. Irwin predicted the song would be a hit, but felt the song would not repeat the success of its predecessor.

Daily Mirror wrote, "A very peculiar song from Steve Harley & Cockney Rebel. Sounds from the bullring, the fairground and the South Seas cover up something very creepy indeed. A hit." The Irvine Herald stated, "It must be hard to follow such a successful disc as 'Smile' but the Rebel has come up with the right one. Back to the same pace as their first hit. Harley has got a very distinctive voice. Won't be a chart-topper, but a biggie all the same."

In the 1996 book Rock: The Rough Guide, authors Jonathan Buckley and Justin Lewis noted that the song "found Harley at his lyrical best". In a retrospective review of The Best Years of Our Lives, Donald A. Guarisco of AllMusic described the song as a "surreal yet romanticized portrait of a convention-flaunting outlaw" and added, "The odd lyrics work thanks to the phenomenal tune backing them up, which contrasts gentle verses built on piano and acoustic guitar with choruses that work in a surprising but slickly integrated reggae beat". In another AllMusic review of the 1975 compilation A Closer Look, Guarisco described the song as "an impressionistic tune that layers surreal, Bob Dylanesque wordplay over a lushly produced musical backdrop that mixes keyboard-driven soft pop with reggae."

Track listing
7-inch single
"Mr. Raffles (Man, It Was Mean)" – 3:03
"Sebastian" (Live Version) – 10:49

Personnel
Steve Harley & Cockney Rebel
 Steve Harley – vocals, guitar, producer
 Jim Cregan – guitar, backing vocals
 Duncan Mackay – keyboards
 George Ford – bass, backing vocals
 Stuart Elliott – drums

Production
 Alan Parsons – producer, mixer, engineer
 Chris Blair – mastering
 Gary Edwards, Peter James – tape operator

Charts

References

1975 songs
1975 singles
EMI Records singles
Steve Harley songs
Songs written by Steve Harley
Song recordings produced by Alan Parsons